Jordan Kilganon is a Canadian slam dunker making a living by taking part in dunk competitions and performing at various shows. He is known for his athleticism and his dunks, such as the Hide-and-Seek, the 360 Scoop Elbow, the Roundhouse, the Lost And Found, and the Scorpion.

Kilganon was born in Sudbury, Ontario, on April 28, 1992.

High School and college
Kilganon graduated from École Secondaire du Sacré Coeur, based out of Sudbury, Ontario. Jordan Kilganon graduated from Humber College in 2015.

Dunking career
Starting at age 15, Kilganon started posting on Youtube some videos of his dunks. In 2021, Jordan Kilganon won Dunk League 3, a contest pitting the world's best dunkers against each other for a $50,000 grand prize.

References

Basketball people from Ontario
Living people
Canadian men's basketball players
Year of birth missing (living people)